was a professional Go player.

Biography
Toshiro was a student of Mukai Kazuo from 1941. He became shodan professional at the Nihon Ki-in in 1941, and reached 9 dan in 1969. He was known for his early resignations of games, sometimes claiming that he refused to play on because of his opponents mistake.

Promotion record

Titles & runners-up

External links
GoBase Profile
GoGameWorld Profile
Sensei's Library Profile

1926 births
2000 deaths
Japanese Go players
People from Tokyo